Mulroy may refer to:

People
 Garth Mulroy (born 1978), South African golfer
 James Mulroy (1899–1986), Irish police officer, first recipient of the Scott Medal for bravery
 Jimmy Mulroy (1940–2013), Irish Gaelic footballer, manager and politician
 John H. Mulroy (1925–1999), first county executive of Onondaga County, New York 
 John Mulroy (footballer) (born 1989), Irish footballer
 Michael Patrick Mulroy, United States Deputy Assistant Secretary of Defense for the Middle East from 2017 to 2019
 Steven J. Mulroy (born 1964), American law professor and politician
 Tom Mulroy (born 1956), American retired soccer player

Places
 Mulroy, Missouri, United States, a former town, now part of the city of Strafford
 Mulroy Bay, County Donegal, Ireland
 Mulroy Island, Ellsworth Land, Antarctica

Other uses
 Battle of Mulroy, a Scottish clan battle fought in August 1688